Ballance Peak is the highest peak at the southern end of the Allan Hills in Oates Land. It was reconnoitered by the New Zealand Antarctic Research Program Allan Hills Expedition (1964) and named for P.F. Ballance, a geologist with the expedition. The MacDonald Spur extends from the Peak to the East.

References
 

Mountains of Oates Land